Tha G-Code is the fourth studio album by American rapper Juvenile. The album was released December 14, 1999, on Cash Money Records. It features the hit singles "U Understand" and "I Got That Fire".

The album was not as successful as Juvenile's previous album, 400 Degreez, but it did reach  number 10 on the US Billboard 200 with first week sales of over 290,000 copies and also topped the Top R&B/Hip-Hop Albums chart during the first week of 2000. The album was certified Platinum by the RIAA on January 24, 2000, for sales of one million copies.

Track listing
 All songs produced by Mannie Fresh.

Charts

Weekly charts

Year-end charts

Certifications

References

Juvenile (rapper) albums
1999 albums
Cash Money Records albums
Albums produced by Mannie Fresh